Tapio Hakanen, better known by his stage name DJ Orkidea (predominantly shortened to Orkidea), is a Finnish electronic music artist. DJ Orkidea has been one of Scandinavia’s top DJs for over 10 years and has been voted twice ’Most Popular Nordic DJ’ in Swedish/Danish Megamind’s voting and elected five times as ’Best DJ’ in Finnish Club Awards. Orkidea has made remixes for big trance labels like Anjunabeats or Hooj Choons and for artists like Tiësto, Tilt, and Way Out West. DJ Orkidea was employed as a sound design manager at Nokia Corporation.

Discography

Albums
Studio albums
 Music Speaks in Thousand Languages (2005)
 Metaverse (2008)
 20 (2011)
 Harmonia (2015)

Compilation albums
 Taika (Selected Works '98-'03) (2003)
 Solarstone Presents... Pure Trance (2012) (with Solarstone)
 Pure Progressive Vol. 1 (2020)

Remix albums
 A Place Called Happiness (2005)
 20Ximer (2013)

Singles
 "Unity" (1999)
 "Beautiful" (2005)
 "YearZero" (with Andy Moor) (2007)
 "Eternal Love" (vs. Mitchell) (2007)
 "Slowmotion" (vs. Solarstone) (2009)
 "Zeitgeist" (vs. Solarstone) (2010)
 "Hale Bopp" (with JS16) (2012)
 "Slowmotion II" (vs. Solarstone) (2013)
 "Redemption" (2015)
 "Z21" (with Activia) (2015)
 "Glowing Skies" (with Lowland) (2015)
 "Revolution Industrielle" (2015)
 "Strange World" (featuring Sami Uotila) (2016)
 "Epicentre" (2017)
 "Forward Forever" (2018)
 "Metta" (2019)

Remixes
 Tiësto - "Flight 643" (2001)
 Tilt - "Twelve" (2004)
 Way Out West - "Killa" (2005)
 Nightwish - "Bye Bye Beautiful" (2008)
 Hans Zimmer - "Time" (2010)
 Nightwish - "11th track on Imaginarium" (2011)
 Solarstone - "Touchstone" (2011)
Hans Zimmer - "Interstellar Theme" (2015)

References

External links 
 DJ Orkidea's website

 Interview with Trance Hub, November 2011

1977 births
Living people
Musicians from Helsinki
Finnish DJs
DJs from Helsinki
Remixers
Finnish trance musicians
Electronic dance music DJs
Nokia people
Microsoft employees